Jalalpur is a village in Muhra block of Gaya district, Bihar, India. The population was 1,555 at the 2011 Indian census.

References

Villages in Gaya district